The Samsung Galaxy Mini (GT-S5570[B/L/i]) is a smartphone manufactured by Samsung that runs the Android operating system. It was announced and released by Samsung in early 2011. In some markets it is known as Samsung Galaxy Next/Pop/NG, while it is sold in the United States as the Samsung Dart exclusively for T-Mobile. It is currently available in four different colors; steel grey, white, lime and orange. With this release the face buttons were changed to capacitive touch, matching the rest of the Galaxy lineup.

It was succeeded by the Samsung Galaxy Mini 2, featuring better screen (480x320 high contrast type vs old 320x240), higher clocked processor (600 vs. 800 MHz), and drastically improved memory (278 vs. 384 MB of RAM; 160 vs. 1830 MB of internal storage available) over the original, as well as Bluetooth v3.0, Wi-Fi Direct & NFC support, among others.

Features
The Galaxy Mini is a 3.5G smartphone that offers quad-band GSM and was announced with two-band HSDPA (900/2100 MHz) at 7.2 Mbit/s. 
The display is a -diagonal TFT LCD with a 240×320 pixels QVGA resolution supporting up to 256,000 colors.

The Galaxy Mini is presented as an entry-level smartphone, and is (as of 13 May 2011) one of the cheapest Android phones on the market.

The Galaxy Mini originally ran on Android 2.2 "Froyo", but in May 2011, Samsung announced that the Galaxy Mini (along with other Galaxy models) will get an official upgrade to Android 2.3 Gingerbread. An official upgrade to Android 2.3.6 (Gingerbread) was released via Samsung Kies on 9 December 2011 for some mobile operators. The Galaxy Mini can also be flashed with custom ROMs such as CyanogenMod releases (although not officially supported by Samsung) where it is codenamed tass. The officially supported version of CyanogenMod on the Galaxy Mini as of August 2012 is CyanogenMod 7.2. It will run CyanogenMod 10/10.1/10.2 and even 11, but it is not officially supported, so there may be stability or performance issues, especially in the latter case.

It can be overclocked to 800 MHz with SetCPU.

Key features
 Dual-touch (two fingers)
 Quad-Band GSM and dual-band 3G support
 7.2 Mbit/s HSDPA
 WiFi 802.11 (b/g/n)
 Bluetooth technology v 2.1
 USB 2.0 (High Speed)
  256K-color QVGA TFT touchscreen
 Qualcomm Snapdragon S1 MSM7227 system-on-chip
 ARMv6 (ARM11) 600 MHz CPU
 Adreno 200 GPU
 Android OS v2.2 (Froyo) with TouchWiz v3.0 UI, upgrade to v2.3.6 (Gingerbread) available in some places.
 384 MB RAM (279 MB RAM available)
 160 MB internal storage, hot-swappable MicroSD slot, 2 GB card included
 3.15 Mpixel fixed-focus camera with geo-tagging
 GPS receiver with A-GPS
 FM radio with RDS and Radio Text (not available in "Dart" version.)
 3.5 mm audio jack
 Document editor
 Accelerometer and proximity sensor
 Swype virtual keyboard
 MicroUSB port (charging and data transfer) and stereo Bluetooth 2.1
 SNS (social networking service) integration
 Image/video editor

See also
Galaxy Nexus
Galaxy Europa (2011)
Samsung Dart is alleged to be the same phone for the US T-Mobile market.

References

External links
 

Android (operating system) devices
Mobile phones introduced in 2011
Galaxy Mini
Galaxy Mini